Le Grand Soir is a 2012 French-Belgian comedy-drama film directed by Benoît Delépine and Gustave de Kervern. The film competed in the Un Certain Regard section at the 2012 Cannes Film Festival where it won the Special Jury Prize. It won the Magritte Award for Best Costume Design.

Plot
Not is a notorious punk while his brother Jean-Pierre leads a square life as a salesman. One day Not realises that his brother needs some support. Jean-Pierre struggles with his job and also fails when he tries to save his marriage. Not teaches his brother to survive after all.

Cast
 Benoît Poelvoorde as Not
 Albert Dupontel as Jean-Pierre Bonzini
 Brigitte Fontaine as Mother – Marie-Annick Bonzini
 Areski Belkacem as Father – René Bonzini
 Bouli Lanners as  the security guard
 Serge Larivière as the director of the 'Grand Litier'
 Stéphanie Pillonca as Jean-Pierre's ex-wife
 Miss Ming as the mute young woman
 Chloé Mons as the punk girl
 Yolande Moreau as the punk girl's mother
 Gérard Depardieu as Juvénal
 Didier Wampas as himself
 Noël Godin as the husband
 Denis Barthe as the barkeeper

References

External links
Official Press Kit 
 

2012 films
2012 comedy-drama films
French comedy-drama films
Belgian comedy-drama films
2010s French-language films
Films directed by Benoît Delépine
Films directed by Gustave Kervern
French-language Belgian films
2010s French films